Pablo Díaz may refer to:

 Pablo Díaz (footballer, born 1971), Spanish footballer
 Pablo Díaz (footballer, born 1981), Spanish footballer
 Pablo Díaz (game show contestant) (born 1997), Spanish violinist and Pasapalabra contestant
 Pedro Díaz (baseball) (born 1910), Cuban baseball player

See also
El Guincho, (born 1983), Spanish musician born Pablo Díaz-Reixa
Paulo Díaz (born 1994), Chilean footballer